Allin Vlasenko (30 June 1938 – 23 November 2021) was a Ukrainian conductor.

References

External links
 

1938 births
2021 deaths
Musicians from Chelyabinsk
Ukrainian conductors (music)